Mariusz Krzywda (born 8 February 1974) is a retired Polish football midfielder.

References

1974 births
Living people
Polish footballers
Igloopol Dębica players
Hutnik Nowa Huta players
Jagiellonia Białystok players
Sandecja Nowy Sącz players
Mławianka Mława players
MG MZKS Kozienice players
Association football midfielders